Minecraft: Story Mode is  an episodic point-and-click video game developed and published by Telltale Games, based on Mojang Studios' sandbox video game Minecraft. The first five episodes were released between October 2015 through March 2016 and an additional three episodes were released as downloadable content (DLC) in mid-2016. A second season consisting of five episodes was released in 2017.

The game follows the same episodic format as other Telltale Games titles, such as The Walking Dead, The Wolf Among Us, Tales from the Borderlands, and Game of Thrones. The story revolves around a player-created character named Jesse, originally an everyman, who later becomes a hero together with their friends. During the first four episodes, Jesse and their friends attempt to reassemble an old group of heroes known as the Order of the Stone to save the Overworld from the destructive Wither Storm. The rest of the first season follows Jesse and their friends, now the new Order of the Stone, on a new adventure after discovering a powerful artifact. In the second season, Jesse faces the powerful Admin.

The game was available for Windows, macOS, PlayStation 3, PlayStation 4, Wii U, Nintendo Switch, Xbox 360, Xbox One, Android, iOS and Apple TV. A retail version was released in December 2016, and the game's first season, excluding the DLC episodes, was released on Netflix in late 2018. However, both seasons of the game became unplayable due to the closure of Telltale Games in late 2018, causing the game to be ultimately discontinued on June 25, 2019. The Netflix release of the game was removed on December 5, 2022.

Gameplay
Minecraft: Story Mode is an episodic interactive comedy-drama point-and-click graphic adventure video game. It was released as a number of episodes similar to Telltale Games' other games. Players can collect items, solve puzzles, and talk to non-player characters through conversation trees to learn about the story and determine what to do next. Decisions that the player makes affect events in both the current episode and later episodes. However, Minecraft: Story Mode is intended to be a family-friendly title, unlike Telltale's previous games, which tend to carry more mature or emotional overtones (including the death of major characters). As such, the decisions are intended to be pivotal and emotional but not to involve mature imagery or themes. Elements of crafting and building were included in the gameplay which are central to Minecraft. The game includes combat and other action sequences, carried out through both quick time events and more arcade-like controls, such as steering around debris on a road. The Netflix version of the first season (excluding the Adventure Pass episodes) was fully pre-rendered, using an enhanced version of the Telltale Tool, uses limited choices and the second version of male and female models, and re-created as an interactive series.

Synopsis

Setting
Minecraft: Story Mode takes place in an interpretation of the world of Minecraft, known as the "Overworld", where the game is the extent of the characters' universe, and the characters are unaware that they are in a game. The main character, Jesse, is an inexperienced resident of said universe who sets out on a journey with their friends within the world of Minecraft to find The Order of the Stone (Gabriel the Warrior, Ellegaard the Redstone Engineer, Magnus the Rogue, Soren the Architect and Ivor the Potion Brewer and Enchanter), five legendary adventurers who saved the Minecraft world. The game includes settings that are normally difficult to access from within Minecraft, including the Nether and The End.

Characters
The player can customize Jesse, including choice of gender and skin tone. Jesse is voiced by Patton Oswalt if male and by Catherine Taber if female. Other main characters within the Minecraft: Story Mode world include Jesse's friends Petra (voiced by Ashley Johnson), Axel (Brian Posehn), Olivia (Martha Plimpton), Lukas (Scott Porter), and Jesse's pet pig, Reuben (Dee Bradley Baker). The first season features several characters in supporting roles, including the Order of the Stone—Gabriel (Dave Fennoy), Magnus (Corey Feldman), Ellegaard (Grey Griffin), Soren (John Hodgman) and Ivor (Paul Reubens), the latter of whom becomes a main character from episode five onwards—former Ocelot member and Blaze Rods leader Aiden (Matthew Mercer); the ruler of Sky City, the Founder (Melissa Hutchison); Milo (Jim Meskimen), the leader of an underground building club; Minecraft YouTubers CaptainSparklez, DanTDM, LDShadowLady, Stampy Cat and Stacy Plays (all played by themselves); Torque Dawg (Adam Harrington); Cassie Rose/The White Pumpkin (Ashly Burch with a disguised voice by Roger L. Jackson); the super-computer PAMA (Jason 'jtop' Topolski); its creator and former Old Builder Harper (Yvette Nicole Brown); the warrior Emily (Audrey Wasilewski); and the Old Builders—Hadrian (Jim Cummings), Mevia (Kari Wahlgren) and Otto (Jamie Alcroft). Season 2 adds several more, such as Jesse's assistant Radar (Yuri Lowenthal), the famous hero Jack (Fred Tatasciore) and his villager sidekick Nurm (Mark Barbolak), Champion City ruler Stella (Ashley Albert) and her treasure sniffing llama Lluna, and the sinister Admin named Romeo (JB Blanc).

There are also several background characters, such as Maya, Ivy and a Fangirl (GK Bowes); Owen (Owen Hill); Gill (Phil LaMarr); an EnderCon Usher named Reuben (also Jason 'jtop' Topolski); a Fanboy (Billy West); Lydia (Lydia Winters); and the EnderCon Building Competition Announcer (Erin Yvette). Stauffer said that the human characters as a whole represent the different types of gamers who play Minecraft. Billy West narrates the first four episodes of the story.

Plot

This is a broad overview of the plot. Certain decisions made by the player will alter details of specific events.

Season 1 (2015–16)
Once, the Order of the Stone, consisting of Gabriel, Soren, Ivor, Ellegaard, and Magnus, defeated the Ender Dragon. In the present-day Jesse, his friends Axel and Olivia, and his pet pig Reuben are preparing for the EnderCon building competition. The Ocelots, a rival team, attempt to sabotage their build, spooking Reuben. Jesse is attacked rescuing him but Petra saves them, who convinces Jesse to help her sell a Wither skull. The buyer, Ivor, tricks them and escapes with it. They pursue him and discover that Ivor will attack Gabriel using a Wither Storm. The group tries to stop it, but are unsuccessful. After recruiting Magnus and Ellegaardthey then head to Soren's lab, hoping that his Formidi-Bomb can destroy the Wither Storm, which Jesse uses to destroy the Storm (although either Magnus or Ellegaard dies in the process), however the beast reforms in three clusters.

The group, joined by Gabriel or Petra (depending on player choice) escape. After that, Ivor takes the group to his lab to enchant a weapon which can destroy the Command Block. Jesse builds the enchanted weapon and destroys the command block, ultimately killing the Wither Storm, but not before the beast kills Reuben, to Jesse's dismay.

Soon after, the Order finds a Flint and Steel, which Ivor reveals that the "Old Builders" created it and supposedly the "Eversource", a chicken that lays spawn eggs. Jesse, Ivor, Lukas, and Petra return to the temple and opens a portal, leading them to Sky City. The group eventually finds the Eversource, but Aiden, the leader of a rival group called the Blaze Rods, steals it. Jesse later defeats Aiden, who is imprisoned in the new Sky City.

Jesse's group retrieve the Flint and Steel and try to return home through another portal, but find themselves in a portal filled corridor. While travelling between them, they arrive in a graveyard with an invite to a supposed party in a nearby mansion, in which they meet some Minecraft YouTubers as well as Cassie Rose, a friend of them. The "White Pumpkin" kills Captain Sparklez and either LDShadowLady or DanTDM through traps. Jesse and their companions discover that the culprit is Cassie. They later defeat her and trap her in a pit filled with endermites.

Jesse and their companions meet PAMA, a computer, which Jesse and Ivor escape from aided by Harper, a scientist who created PAMA. She then takes them to her lab to retrieve something to deactivate PAMA, where Jesse frees Lukas/Petra before they are captured. Harper directs Jesse to PAMA's power source which they remove, freeing the other companion.

Back at the portal corridor, Harper reveals the Atlas which can help Jesse's group return home. The Old Builders (consisting of Hadrian, Mevia, and Otto) imprison Jesse and force him to compete in games to win his friends' freedom, but Jesse makes a deal with Otto to free his friends, before battling and defeating Hadrian and Mevia, returning home at last.

Season 2 (2017) 
Radar, Jesse's new assistant, notifies Jesse of an upcoming adventure with Petra. Jesse helps citizens prepare for Founding Day before meeting her. Their meeting place self-destructs to reveal a bottomless pit - where Jesse finds a mysterious gauntlet that gets stuck on his/her hand; but they manage to escape. Petra finds Jack, a hero who can help Jesse remove the gauntlet and the "heckmouth" - the pit. Jack reveals that the gauntlet is tracked to an Ocean Monument, and that a "Structure Block" can close the pit. Jesse convinces Jack and his villager friend Nurm to take them and Petra to it. At the monument's centre, the Admin appears and attempts to kill them, however they and their companions escape to where Jesse collects a Structure Block and frees Jack's old friend Vos.

After Jesse defeats it, the Admin returns and challenges Jesse's group to reclaim the clock (later destroyed by Jack/Petra) in his ice palace, who they then head towards, later joined by Stella and Lluna. However, Vos is revealed to have been the Admin the whole time, and he imprisons Jesse and the person who didn't destroy the clock, while the person who did gets the gauntlet transferred to their hand.

Jesse resolves with their friends to find "Prisoner X" (later revealed as Xara), who apparently knows how to escape the maze. Jesse opens their cell, but has to leave either Nurm or Lluna, a llama that they befriended, behind, before they combat whoever destroyed the clock and then with Xara, attack the Admin. Although it fails, they manage to free Petra/Jack from the Admin's control. The group then escapes the prison with Radar in tow.

Xara then shows them a portal which she re-powers, heading to an underground area below the bedrock. Jesse reunites with Ivor, who has become a ninja. Jesse learns more about the Admin, whose name is revealed to be Romeo, and that Romeo, Xara, and their friend Fred once were friends, but a disagreement led to Fred's death and Romeo's corruption. Jesse finds Xara's bed, and can choose to give it to her. Jesse then has to choose between saving either Radar or the people below the bedrock before escaping. 

After returning home, Jesse, Petra, and Jack come up with a plan to battle Romeo. If Jesse gave Xara her bed, Romeo destroys the neighboring Champion City, but if Jesse didn't give Xara her bed, she attempts to attack Romeo only to get strangled to death. It is revealed that Ivor managed to free Nurm/Lluna from the prison. With Lukas's assistance, they arrive at the "Terminal Space", the home of the Admin. Jesse, Jack, and Petra reaches it and Jesse enters it, collects Fred's gauntlet, and battles Romeo. After a tense fight, Jesse successfully uses the gauntlet to strip Romeo of his power. Jesse then has a choice to either take Romeo back for redemption or leave him to his fate, and if they rescued the people below the bedrock in the previous episode, then Radar arrives to save them, if not, Romeo distracts the monsters of Terminal Space for Jesse and their friends to escape. Jesse's final choice involves them either choosing to leave Beacontown and have adventures with Petra or staying as mayor.

Episodes

Season 1 (2015–16)
The main Minecraft: Story Mode game was separated into five episodes for its first season, released in one month intervals. Three additional episodes were later released.

Season 2 (2017)
In July 2017, the first trailer was released for the second season, along with a release date of July 11.

Development and releases
The idea for Minecraft: Story Mode came around the end of 2012 when Telltale Games was engaged in work for Tales from the Borderlands, an episodic series based on the Borderlands series. The idea of developing stories around other established video game franchises led the team to brainstorm the idea for a Minecraft-related game, given that the game was essentially a "blank canvas" for storytelling, according to Job Stauffer, and would create an interesting challenge. The two groups recognized the amount of fan-generated narrative content that existed in the way of YouTube videos and other media forms that demonstrated the potential for storytelling in the game. Many on Telltale's staff were also already fans of Minecraft, with a private server that they played on, with some of the incidents that occurred on there becoming ideas for the game's story. Telltale began negotiations with Mojang in early 2013 and began work on the title shortly thereafter. Stauffer noted that Microsoft's acquisition of Mojang was not a factor in the game's development, as their interaction with Mojang began well before Microsoft's negotiations.

Telltale opted to create a new main character of Jesse for Minecraft: Story Mode instead of using default "Steve" character from Minecraft, feeling that they did not want to attempt to rewrite how players already saw this character in the game. Other primary characters in the game are loosely designed around archetypes of common player-characters for Minecraft, such that those that engage in building, fighting, or griefing other players. The game will not attempt to provide any background for some concepts in Minecraft, such as the creepers, as to avoid the various interpretations that fans have done for these elements, though they are elements of the game's story.

Stauffer stated that the game's story would be aimed as family-friendly, similar to the films The Goonies or Ghostbusters; their intended content would be equivalent to a PG-13 or PEGI-12 rating. A number of the voice actors are alumni of such films of the 1980s such as Corey Feldman who starred in The Goonies, and the game includes various references to these types of films. Stauffer reflected that while Telltale's more recent games like The Walking Dead were more mature stories, their original adventure games like Sam & Max and Strong Bad's Cool Game for Attractive People were written as family-friendly, and that they consider their approach to Minecraft: Story Mode as "part of our DNA". The story was aimed to be accessible to both existing players of Minecraft – both novice and advanced players – and to new audiences outside of the game.

Minecraft: Story Mode was formally announced in December 2014 as a collaboration project between Mojang and Telltale; the announcement was presented as an interactive adventure game named "Info Quest II". Its first trailer was released during the MINECON 2015 convention in early July. The game was planned for a five-episode series for release on Android, iOS, Windows, OS X, PlayStation and Xbox consoles in late 2015; Telltale also released the game for the Wii U, only a month after the original Minecraft first came to a Nintendo platform. It was also the first time a Telltale title had been released on a Nintendo platform since Back to the Future: The Game. In addition, Minecraft: Story Mode – The Complete Adventure, incorporating both the main episodes and downloadable content, was announced for the Nintendo Switch.

The series released for most systems on October 13, 2015, with the PlayStation Vita and Wii U versions to follow at a later date. A season pass of the game was available for purchase on October 27, 2015, which allows the player to access the other four episodes once they are released. Retail versions of the game were released on October 27, 2015.

Netflix and Telltale signed a partnership in June 2018 for Netflix to offer Telltale's games over the service starting later that year, with Minecraft: Story Mode as the first planned title for the service. Amid troubles related to the bankruptcy of Telltale Games in October and November 2018, sufficient staff remained with Telltale to complete work on this version, which was released onto Netflix on November 27 and December 5, 2018. The Netflix series was discontinued on December 5 of 2022.

Season 2 
The first episode of Minecraft: Story Mode – Season Two was released on July 11, 2017, for Windows, macOS, PlayStation 4, Xbox 360, Xbox One, iOS and Android. It continued the story from the first season, with the player's choices affecting elements within Season Two. Patton Oswalt, Catherine Taber, Ashley Johnson, and Scott Porter were confirmed to continue voicework for the new season. The game supports the new Crowd Play feature that Telltale introduced in Batman: The Telltale Series, allowing up to 2,000 audience members to vote on decisions for the player using Twitch or other streaming services.

On August 3, 2017, Telltale announced that the second episode, "Giant Consequences", would be released on August 15. The rest of the episodes were released on September 19, November 7, and December 19, 2017.

Closure of Telltale Games
In November 2018, Telltale Games began the process of closing down the studio due to financial issues. Most of its games started to become delisted from digital storefronts, including Minecraft: Story Mode. According to GOG.com, they had to pull the title due to "expiring licensing rights". The Minecraft team stated that even for those that had purchased the titles before their delisting, the episodes would no longer be downloadable after June 2019.

Following the closure of Telltale, Antimo, one of the game's composers, has stated that there is currently legal confusion as to where the rights to the soundtrack lies, leading to the soundtrack only being available for streaming on SoundCloud and YouTube, where they were released before the closure of Telltale.

Soundtrack 
Minecraft: Story Mode features an original soundtrack composed by American duo Antimo & Welles, consisting of Skyler Barto (Antimo) and Andrew Arcadi (Welles). The soundtrack for Season One consists of 42 tracks, while the soundtrack for Season Two has 51 tracks. On December 21, 2018, during the closure of Telltale, the duo released the Story Mode Archives, an album consisting of 18 unused tracks from the games. Several more tracks were re-released in late 2021.

Reception

Minecraft: Story Mode received "mixed or average reviews" from critics, with the Nintendo Switch version earning a weighted average of 67 based on 5 critics.

Season 1 (2015–16)

Episode 1: The Order of the Stone
Aggregating review website Metacritic gave the Windows version 71/100 based on 25 reviews, the PlayStation 4 version 71/100 based on 23 reviews and the Xbox One version 77/100 based on 13 reviews. On GameRankings, a score of 78.59% was given based on 11 reviews for the Xbox One version, 77.50% for Wii U based on 4 reviews, 73.53% for the PC version based on 16 reviews, and 73.29% for PlayStation 4 based on 21 reviews.

Episode 2: Assembly Required
Metacritic gave the Windows version 59/100 based on 13 reviews, the PlayStation 4 version 53/100 based on 7 reviews and the Xbox One version 61/100 based on 8 reviews.

Episode 3: The Last Place You Look
Metacritic gave the Windows version 73/100 based on 10 reviews, the PlayStation 4 version 73/100 based on 7 reviews and the Xbox One version 75/100 based on 9 reviews.

Episode 4: A Block and a Hard Place
Metacritic gave the Windows version 68/100 based on 8 reviews, the PlayStation 4 version 72/100 based on 8 reviews and the Xbox One version 71/100 based on 8 reviews.

Episode 5: Order Up!
Metacritic gave the Windows version 70/100 based on 6 reviews, the PlayStation 4 version 72/100 based on 9 reviews and the Xbox One version 69/100 based on 6 reviews.

Episode 6: A Portal to Mystery
Metacritic gave the Windows version 64/100 based on 5 reviews, the PlayStation 4 version 69/100 based on 6 reviews and the Xbox One version 71/100 based on 5 reviews.

Episode 7: Access Denied
Metacritic gave the Windows version 69/100 based on 4 reviews, the PlayStation 4 version 68/100 based on 6 reviews and the Xbox One version 71/100 based on 5 reviews.

Episode 8: A Journey's End?
Metacritic gave the PlayStation 4 version 69/100 based on 6 reviews.

Season 2 (2017)

Episode 1: Hero in Residence
Metacritic gave the PC version 71/100 based on 8 reviews,
the PlayStation 4 version 67/100 based on 8 reviews,
and the Xbox One version 76/100 based on 4 reviews.

Episode 2: Giant Consequences
Metacritic gave the PC version 74/100 based on 8 critics and the PlayStation 4 version a score of 73/100 based on 4 reviews. On GameRankings, the PlayStation 4 version has a rating of 65.00% based on 2 reviews and on the PC version, it has a score of 72.86% based on 7 reviews.

Episode 3: Jailhouse Block
Metacritic gave the PC version 71/100, based on 8 reviews, and the PlayStation 4 63/100 based on 4 reviews.

Episode 4: Below the Bedrock
Metacritic gave the PC version a score of 74/100 based on 5 critics.

Episode 5: Above and Beyond
Metacritic gave the PC version a score of 78/100 based on 4 critics.

References

External links
  (archived on February 11, 2018)
Official website for season 2 (archived on March 12, 2018)

2015 video games
Android (operating system) games
Adventure games
Episodic video games
IOS games
Minecraft
MacOS games
Nintendo Switch games
PlayStation 3 games
PlayStation 4 games
PlayStation Network games
PlayStation Vita games
Point-and-click adventure games
Single-player video games
Telltale Games games
Video game spin-offs
Video games developed in the United States
Video games featuring protagonists of selectable gender
Wii U eShop games
Wii U games
Windows games
Xbox 360 games
Xbox 360 Live Arcade games
Xbox One games
Products and services discontinued in 2019